Dreissigacker as a surname may refer to

 Dick Dreissigacker (born 1947), American rower and engineer, co-founder of sports equipment company Concept2
 Emily Dreissigacker (born 1988), American biathlete, daughter of Dick Dreissigacker
 Hannah Dreissigacker (born 1986), American biathlete, daughter of Dick Dreissigacker
 Pete Dreissigacker, American rower and engineer, co-founder of sports equipment company Concept2, brother of Dick Dreissigacker